Șipotele River may refer to:

 Șipotele, a tributary of the Izvorul Negru in Bacău County
 Șipotele, a tributary of the Telejenel in Prahova County

See also 
 Șipot River (disambiguation)
 Șipotu River (disambiguation)